Hafsa or Hafsah (which is very often confused with Hafza and Hafiza, but all three of them are different names) is an Arabic female given name. It originated from Hafsa, the fourth wife of the Islamic prophet Muhammad and daughter of second Muslim caliph Umar. It is a popular name among Sunni Muslims.

People
 Hafsat Abiola (b. 1974), a Nigerian human rights, civil rights and democracy activist
 Hafsa Bekri (Hafsa Bekri-Lamrani), Iraqi-Moroccan poet
 Hafsa Bint al-Hajj al-Rukuniyya (d. 1190/91), Andalusian poet
 Hafsa bint Umar, daughter of Umar ibn al-Khattab and wife of Muhammad
 Hafsa Sultan (1479–1534), Ottoman Sultan Selim I's wife and the mother of Süleyman the Magnificent
 Hafsa Şeyda Burucu (born 1991), Turkish karateka
 Hafsa Bint Sirin   (b.651 – d.719), female scholar of Islam and sister of Muhammad ibn Sirin
 Hafsa Shaker Farooqui

References

Arabic feminine given names